Kapkinka is a rural locality (a selo) in Vasilyevskoye Rural Settlement, Oktyabrsky District, Volgograd Oblast, Russia. The population was 99 as of 2010. There are 4 streets.

Geography 
Kapkinka is located on Yergeni, on the Myshkova River, 33 km northeast of Oktyabrsky (the district's administrative centre) by road. Vasilyevka is the nearest rural locality.

References 

Rural localities in Oktyabrsky District, Volgograd Oblast